Zachary "Zac" Shaw (born 24 September 1995) is a British visually impaired sprinter who competes in the T12 and T13 disability classifications. At the age of nine he became afflicted with stargardt disease. In 2013 he started training for the 2016 Paralympic Games in Rio de Janeiro but was ultimately unsuccessful. In 2014 Shaw won silver in both 100 metres and 200 metres at the UK School Games. In 2015 he made his international debut in the Berlin IPC Grand Prix where he won bronze.

Later that year he made his first Great Britain squad for the IPC Athletics World Championships, where he finished sixth in both the 100 metres and 200 metres. Shaw won more gold medals in various events and later participated in the World Para Athletics Championships in London. He competed at the 2018 Commonwealth Games in Australia's Gold Coast and has been selected for the 2022 Commonwealth Games in Birmingham. England.

Personal history
Shaw was born in the Lincolnshire town of Grimsby on 24 September 1995. He is the youngest of six boys and his family is involved in the business industry. At the age of nine Shaw started to become afflicted with stargardt disease, an inherited condition that affects his central vision, that went undiagnosed until he was 13. Shaw had his secondary education at Oasis Academy Wintringham and The Grimsby Institute. He went to Sheffield Hallam University and later Loughborough University after receiving a sports scholarship in 2016. Outside of para-athletics, Shaw works as a model.

Biography
He began training for a planned entry for the 2016 Summer Paralympics held in Rio de Janeiro in November 2013 when he joined Cleethorpes Athletic Club. Shaw was placed in the T12 and T13 disability classifications for those with visual impairments. The following year, he began these efforts by winning the silver medal in both the 100 and 200 metres events at the 2014 UK School Games. In 2015 Shaw debuted on the international Paralympics scene by competing in the Berlin IPC Grand Prix where he won the bronze medal.

Later that year he made the Great Britain squad for the IPC Athletics World Championships in Doha after qualifying with a time of 11.32 seconds at the CAU Inter-County Championships at Bedford International Athletic Stadium, placing sixth overall in the 100 metres (T13) with an 11.33 seconds effort which at the time was his personal best in the discipline, and finishing sixth in the final of the 200 metres (T13) with a time of 22.88 seconds, another personal best. Shaw trained for the World Championships by undertaking sessions in sand dunes at Cleethorpes Beach and focusing on his strengths.

In 2016, Shaw won the gold medal in three events: the T13 200 metres at the Dubai IPC Grand Prix, the 100 metres in the BUCS Outdoor Athletics Championships, and in the same discipline at the Barcelona Kern Pharma – Sauleda. He along with 48 other para-athletes were chosen to represent Great Britain at the IPC Athletics European Championships in Grosseto in June. Shaw placed seventh in the 100 metres and came fifth in the 200 metres (both in the T13 classification). In spite of these efforts, Shaw was told later in the year that he had not made the team for the Summer Paralympics. While Shaw spoke of his disappointment he said that it was "the start of a long journey."

In March 2017, he won the 200 metres event at that year's Dubai IPC Grand Prix, and retained his title in the 100 metres discipline in the BUCS Outdoor Athletics Championships held the following month. Shaw competed in the London World Para Athletics Championships in July. Although Shaw was targeting a medal he came fourth in his semi-final for the 100 metres (T12) and his effort resulted in him failing to progress into the final. Nevertheless, he narrowly won his heat in the 200 metres (T12) which advanced him into the semi-finals with a new personal best of 22.73 seconds but failed to qualify for the final after placing second, behind Algeria's.Nasser Djamil.

In December 2017, Shaw was announced as one of eighteen para-athletes that had been selected to represent England at the 2018 Commonwealth Games due to be held in Australia's Gold Coast. He visited a Tenerife training camp in January 2018 to prepare to the Games. He competed in the T12 100m at the Gold Coast, running second in his heat behind Hilton Langenhoven, but did not progress to the final.

In June 2022, he was named in the 72-member squad selected to represent England in athletics at the 2022 Commonwealth Games in Birmingham. He will compete in the T12 100m. He was a batonbearer in the Queen's Baton Relay when it visited Hull, Yorkshire, on 13 July 2022.

References

External links

1995 births
Sportspeople from Grimsby
Alumni of Sheffield Hallam University
Alumni of Loughborough University
British male sprinters
Living people